The Cambodian–Spanish War (Spanish: Guerra Hispano-Camboyana; Filipino: Digmaang Kambodyano-Espanyol; Khmer: សង្គ្រាមកម្ពុជា-អេស្ប៉ាញ) (1593-1597) was an attempt to conquer Cambodia on behalf of King Satha I and Christianize Cambodia's population by the Spanish and Portuguese Empires. Along with the Spanish, Spanish Filipinos, native Filipinos, Mexican recruits, and Japanese mercenaries participated in the invasion of Cambodia.

Background 
Each country that participated in the war possessed different motives for their invasion of Cambodia. Specifically, the Thai interference and the Spanish expedition was a result of a power struggle between rival factions in Cambodia's government. Both Spanish and Portuguese took part in the invasion of Cambodia because King Philip II ruled both Spain and Portugal as the Iberian Union.

In February 1593, Thai ruler Naresuan attacked Cambodia. Later on, in May 1593, 100,000 Thai (Siamese) soldiers invaded Cambodia. The increasing Siamese expansion, which later got the approval of China, drove the Cambodian king Satha I to search for allies overseas, ultimately finding it in Portuguese adventurer Diogo Veloso and his Spanish associates Blas Ruiz de Hernán Gonzáles and Gregorio Vargas Machuca.

The Iberians tried to bring reinforcements from Portuguese Malacca, but were unsuccessful, and the same happened in the Spanish Philippines, where governor Gómez Pérez Dasmariñas rejected an alliance with Cambodia, preferring the option to try to arbitrate the conflict with Siam. In reality, Dasmariñas was likely more interested in a campaign in the Moluccas. As a consequence, the Thai conquered Longvek in July 1594, and Satha was executed or fled to Laos.

The three Iberians, now accompanied by Pantaleón Carnero and Antonio Machado, were captured and sent to Siam. However, Veloso and Vargas convinced Naresuan to send them as emissaries to Manila, where they escaped, while Ruiz and the rest managed to seize the junk that carried them as prisoners. They all reunited in Manila, where they organized a military expedition.

Conflict 
The first Spanish expedition arrived in 1596 in three ships under the command of Juan Juárez Gallinato, having 140 Spanish soldiers and some Philippine islanders and Japanese Christian mercenaries. Gallinato's ship was driven away by a storm, but the other two, commanded by Ruiz and Veloso, reached Cambodia, where they learned the throne had been taken by the king's former vassal Preah Ram I. The presence of the Iberians became troublesome after they clashed with and defeated a force of 2000 Chinese, and in view of the king's hostility, Veloso advised the expedition to assault his palace and capture him. The assault was unsuccessful, as the king died, and the expedition was forced to rejoin Gallinato and escape. Gallinato then ordered the fleet to search for allies in Laos, but their failure forced them away, and the expedition disbanded shortly after. 

In October of the same year, Ruiz and Veloso found an heir to Satha, his second son Barom Reachea II, who was supported by Laos. With their help, the young king invaded Cambodia and was enthroned in May 1597. The king granted the Iberians territorial rights over two provinces on the east and west sides of the Mekong River. Veloso later secured permission and funds to build a fort, but the situation was still unstable. In 1599, he commanded four ships from Manila but two of them were wrecked in a storm. The Malay Muslim admiral Laksamana, who opposed the Iberians, took advantage of the situation to provoke an attack on one of their men, Luis Ortiz. The Spaniards retaliated by attacking a Malay camp, but Malays, Chams and their allies attacked and slaughtered the Spaniards and Portuguese, including Diogo Veloso. Only a few Filipinos and one Spaniard survived the massacre.

Because of its defeat, Spain's planned Christianization of Cambodia failed. Laksamana later had Barom Reachea II executed. Cambodia became dominated by the Thai in July 1599.

See also
 Luis Pérez Dasmariñas
 Blas Ruiz
 Diogo Veloso
 Post-Angkor Period
 Castilian War
 Spanish–Moro conflict
 Cambodian–Dutch War
 Spanish East Indies
 Siamese–Cambodian War (1591–1594)
 El Piñal

References

Wars involving the Philippines
Wars involving Spain
Wars involving Cambodia